Metro Parks Tacoma (formerly the Metropolitan Park District of Tacoma) is a municipal corporation that oversees parks and recreation services in and around the city of Tacoma, Washington, United States.

History
The parks district was originally a part of the Tacoma city government, established by the city's 1880 charter. In 1883 city councilmembers were appointed to oversee city parks, and in 1890 a board of park commissioners was appointed by the mayor. In 1907 the Washington State Legislature passed legislation which allowed cities to form separate park districts. That same year, the city government created the Metropolitan Park District of Tacoma, an entity independent of the city government with its own authority to collect property taxes.

Metro Parks Tacoma owns and operates parks and recreation facilities in the city of Tacoma as well as the unincorporated areas of Browns Point and Dash Point.

Notable facilities
Point Defiance Park, including the following facilities located within the park boundaries:
Point Defiance Zoo and Aquarium
Fort Nisqually
Wright Park Arboretum
W. W. Seymour Botanical Conservatory, located within Wright Park
Northwest Trek Wildlife Park near Eatonville
Titlow Beach

References

External links

 Metro Parks Tacoma Official site

Government of Tacoma, Washington
Geography of Tacoma, Washington
Park districts in the United States